Anime South was a three-day anime convention held in the city of Pensacola, Florida. The convention also has the distinction of being the first anime convention to garner its seed money from a small number of contributors who desired an anime convention in the area.

Programming
Anime South hosted many events common to other anime conventions, such as anime screenings, panels and workshops, game shows, dealers room, artist alley, video game room, dance, and cosplay events.

History
Anime South was created by one of the co-founders of Anime USA. Planning took place over a two-month period, after which the largest luxury hotel in the region, The Hilton Sandestin Beach Golf Resort & Spa, was contracted for November 18–20, 2005. The 2015 event was cancelled due to financial issues.

Event history

References

External links 
Anime South website (archived)

Defunct anime conventions
Festivals established in 2005
2005 establishments in Florida
Annual events in Florida
Festivals in Florida
Tourist attractions in Pensacola, Florida
Recurring events disestablished in 2013
2013 disestablishments in Florida